Boronia adamsiana, commonly known as Barbalin boronia, is a plant in the citrus family, Rutaceae and is endemic to a small area in the south-west of Western Australia. It is an erect, hairy shrub with trifoliate leaves and pink or white, four-petalled flowers.

Description
Its branches, leaves and parts of the flowers are densely covered with grey, woolly hairs. The eight stamens alternate in length with those near the sepals longer than those near the petals.

Taxonomy and naming
Boronia adamsiana was first formally described in 1890 by Ferdinand von Mueller and the description was published in Proceedings of the Linnean Society of New South Wales from the type specimen collected by Mary Annie Adams (1874-1931) a native born Western Australian who collected specimens for Mueller. The specific epithet (adamsiana) honours her.

Distribution and habitat
Barbalin boronia grows in scrub and heath, on flats and road reserves in the Avon Wheatbelt and Coolgardie biogeographic regions, approximately between Beacon, Trayning and Mount Marshall.

Conservation
Boronia adamsiana is classified as vulnerable under the Australian Government Environment Protection and Biodiversity Conservation Act 1999 and as "Threatened Flora (Declared Rare Flora — Extant)" by the Department of Environment and Conservation (Western Australia). The main threats to the species are livestock grazing, inappropriate fire regimes, competing land uses and broadscale vegetation clearing.

References

adamsiana
Flora of Western Australia
Plants described in 1890
Taxa named by Ferdinand von Mueller